Château de Butenheim is a 13th-century castle ruin in the commune of Petit-Landau, in the department of Haut-Rhin, Alsace, France. It is a listed historical monument since 1932.

References

Ruined castles in Haut-Rhin
Monuments historiques of Haut-Rhin